Keiser University - Latin American Campus (KU) is a branch campus of Keiser University in Florida, United States. It is located in the small town of San Marcos, Carazo, Nicaragua. It is perhaps one of the only U.S. universities in Central America offering a 4-year Bachelor of Arts degree in the areas of Psychology, Business Administration with concentrations in Marketing, Finance, International Business, and Human Resources, Political Science, Software Engineering, Management Information Systems, Interdisciplinary Studies, among other programs from Associate to Doctoral degrees online. As part of the Keiser University conglomerate, Keiser University LAC students are able to do 2-years under IDS and transfer to the over 100 programs offered by any of the Florida campuses of Keiser University, as well as the programs offered by Everglades University, also located in Florida.

History
The school uses the campus formerly belonging to La Antigua Escuela Normal de Señoritas de San Marcos. From its founding in 1993, this school operated under the name University of Mobile, Latin American Campus in San Marcos and was operated by the University of Mobile. Ave Maria College acquired the school from the University of Mobile on July 1, 2000.  The school was then called Ave Maria College of the Americas until it became the branch campus for Ave Maria University in 2007.

The Latin American Campus was then acquired by the Keiser University on July 1, 2013. Ever since, Keiser University and local partners have invested in infrastructure to allow the student body to grow significantly in the next 5-years. Keiser University LAC also offers a hybrid Graduate Certificate Program in Management and Leadership mainly offered in the offices of the Language Institute in Managua, located at the newly opened Ofiplaza San Dionisio complex.

Financial Aid
Keiser University Latin American Campus is one of the few U.S universities around the world, located outside the United States, authorized by the Department of Education to offer students Federal Aid to finance their studies. Keiser University participates in the federal student loan program which allows students and their parents to borrow money to help meet their educational costs. Educational loans must be paid back with interest. These loans have low interest rates and offer flexible repayment terms, benefits, and options.

In addition, Keiser University LAC also offers institutional aid, that allows students without dual citizenship to apply for Financial Aid packages that make their attendance at KULAC possible, at a price point that is affordable for the students and their families.

References

External links

Keiser University
Universities in Nicaragua
Educational institutions established in 1993
1993 establishments in Nicaragua